Hakea meisneriana is a shrub in the family Proteaceae and is endemic to Western Australia. It has small, nectar rich, creamy white flowers in clusters in the upper branches from August to November.

Description
The inflorescence is a single cluster of 36-44 white or cream flowers in clusters in the upper  leaf axils of branchlets. Flowering occurs from August to November.

Taxonomy and naming
Hakea meisneriana was first formally described by Richard Kippist in 1855 and the description was published in Hooker's Journal of Botany and Kew Garden Miscellany.  Named in honour of Swiss botanist Carl Meisner who described many Hakea species.

Distribution and habitat
It is endemic to an area in the Wheatbelt and Goldfields-Esperance region of Western Australia from Dalwallinu to Coolgardie and south to Dumbleyung and Norseman where it is found on sandplains growing in sandy, loamy and gravelly soils often above or around laterite.

Conservation status
Hakea meisneriana is classified as "not threatened" by the Western Australian Government Department of Parks and Wildlife.

References

meisneriana
Eudicots of Western Australia
Plants described in 1855